Tavar Zawacki formerly known as 'ABOVE' (born 1981) is an American abstract artist living and working in Lisbon, Portugal. For twenty years (1996–2016) Tavar Zawacki created and signed all of his artworks with his street artist pseudonym, 'ABOVE'. Tavar was born and raised in California until the age of 19, at which time, Zawacki bought a one-way flight from California to Paris, France, bringing with him a backpack full of art supplies, all the money in his bank account (US$1,500), and a 'rise above your fears' approach to starting his art career. Starting in Paris in 2000, Tavar transitioned from painting traditional letter style graffiti of A-B-O-V-E, to his 'Above arrow' icon that represented his optimistic mentality to 'rise above fears, challenges, and anything holding you back from your goals.' During a 20-year period, the artworks of ABOVE could be seen in over 100 cities spanning 50 countries around the world.

In January 2017, Zawacki decided to step out of his self-imposed shadow of anonymity, and start creating, and signing artworks with his real birth name –  allowing more freedom of creative exploration, as well as liberation from the arrow icon he has associated himself with.  Tavar Zawacki's painting styles with his large scale mural works, as well as his indoor fine art are characterized by the use of hard-edge painting, color field, geometric abstraction, Op art, and trompe-l'œil painting styles. Zawacki has been showcasing his work in galleries and creative institutions around the world since 2005.

Career

Early career of traditional graffiti (1995–2000) 

Tavar Zawacki was born in the foothills of Northern California in 1981 from two creative hippie parents who invented his name. Tavar was encouraged by both parents at a very young age to express himself through art, and music. At the age of 13 years old, Tavar was introduced to skateboarding and graffiti. Zawacki stated 'as a teenager, I spent my time after school skateboarding and painting graffiti on trains at the train yard. I was magnetized towards skateboarding, and graffiti because they were both D.I.Y. and independent ways of expressing myself.' 
In 1995, at age fourteen, Tavar started spray painting the traditional letter style graffiti with his moniker 'ABOVE' on freight trains in California. Five years later, he changed from painting traditional letter graffiti to an arrow symbol that pointed 'Above'. Zawacki credits an impactful, and pivotal experience where a train he had painted with the letters A-B-O-V-E was leaving the train station and his name was completely illegible due to the increased speed of the departing train. He realized that he needed to find a way for his artwork to connect and be recognized in a fraction of a second.

'ABOVE' Arrow period (2000–2006) 

During a six-year period from 2000 to 2006, Tavar's artist focus was exclusively on the 'ABOVE' arrow icon he invented. During a 20-year period, the artworks of ABOVE could be seen in over 100 cities spanning 50 countries around the world. In 2000, at the age of 19, Tavar moved from California to Paris, France. At that time Paris was home to street artists like Zevs, Invader, Stak, and André Tavar and the other Parisian artists were part of a movement in street art that was heavily based on characters and logos. During this period Tavar started painting his upward-pointing 'Above' arrow icon. After two years of painting his arrow logo in the streets of Paris, Zawacki returned to California in 2003, where he invented a technique of his hanging wooden 'Arrow mobiles' from overhead wires. He would later proliferate this hanging process of his 'arrow mobiles' for years to come.

In the summer of 2004, Zawacki went on a self-titled "U.S.A. Tour". It was during Zawacki's self-titled, U.S.A. tour that he introduced elements of word play by writing a word on both sides of the spinning arrows to suggest a dialog. Zawacki has declined to respond to questions about how he is able to hang his mobiles so high, saying, "I value and respect that we all have imaginations and for me to interfere with what your imagination would be wrong."

Zawacki returned to Europe in 2005. When asked in an interview why he did not hang his arrow mobiles in Europe after his U.S.A. tour, he responded, "In the United States there is an almost infinite amount of overhead telephone wires and street cables. However, I was unsure if the different European countries had many overhead wires like in the United States? I decided instead to make wooden arrows that were able to adhere to the sides of buildings, at elevated heights. During my travels around Europe, I was able to in fact see that most of the countries I visited had overhead wires to support the future hanging of my arrow mobiles." Tavar visited 15 countries during his 4-month long European tour, installing around 500 of the larger wooden fabric arrows.

In 2006, Tavar began planning a new tour which he titled the 'Sign Language Tour'. By his own reports, he counterfeited Eurail tickets for a six-month duration, spanning 26 countries around Europe. Tavar's 2006 'Sign Language Tour' focused almost exclusively on his word play sign language arrow mobiles. Zawacki is quoted saying 'sign language is a form of communication using movements instead of sound. I found a lot of charm knowing that the arrow mobiles, once installed, are constantly spinning around. To create a dialog I painted one word on each side of the arrow. Conceptually speaking, when the wind would spin the arrow mobile there would be a small word play dialog to anyone who looked at it." He customized arrows to certain countries language such as French (J'ai/faim, chez/vous), Spanish (Hace/sol, como/esta) German (uber/alle) and Italian (ciao/ciao)."

South and Central America Tour (2007) 
In 2007, Tavar expanded from the wordplay of the previous year's 'Sign Language' tour around Europe. His 2007 South, and Central America tour was focused on painting larger wordplay murals on the exterior of building facades. He said in an interview, "I wanted to return to painting letters, like the traditional graffiti I did when I was younger, but instead of painting my graffiti name, I wanted to paint word-based art that was site specific and could easily be read and understood. He funded his 'South Central Tour' by working as a waiter in a restaurant in Alaska for four months in spring 2007. His south-central tour lasted six months, starting in October 2007 in Rio de Janeiro, Brazil, and ending in Mexico City, Mexico in May 2008. Tavar had painted in 18 cities in 13 countries along the six-month tour.

Stencil period (2008–2010) 

2008 was the start of another new chapter in Tavar Zawacki's career. While still using his street moniker, ABOVE, Tavar had abandoned his previous year's focus of the arrow icon, and started painting site-specific figurative stencil works that often had a statement of social and or political awareness.

In September 2008, Zawacki traveled to Lisbon, Portugal, where he painted his "Giving to the poor" stencil commenting on the social issue of homelessness. He stated, "Every day I walked by this bank ATM machine and this particular homeless woman was sitting in the same place every day begging for money. I found it sadly ironic that just six feet away from here there were people lining up to withdraw money. The sharp social and economic clash inspired me to make this piece." In October 2008, Zawacki returned to California, when the New York Stock Exchange (NTSE) crashed, marking a worsening of the 2008 recession. He stenciled on the exterior of a Washington Mutual building (one of several banks that collapsed during this period) an image of the NYSE bar graph with a downward sloping red line that went all the way down into the street gutter, mimicking the results that occurred just a few days before.

In April 2009, Zawacki created a stencil mural depicting four children searching for "Easter AIGs" in response to the breaking scandal surrounding American International Group and the degree to which it profited from 2008 bailout.

In May 2009, Zawacki started another tour of Europe lasting four months. This tour did not seem to have a title, as with most of his previous tours. In July, he painted a social and political stencil piece titled 'Bridging The Divide' directly on the Berlin Wall. The artwork depicted a young girl jumping up, with arm extended trying to grab a bouquet of flowers from a person on the opposite side of the Berlin. The painted scene was completed with a smiling guard looking at the young girl jumping. 'Bridging The Divide' was painted on the 20th anniversary of the German reunification

In January 2010, just days after the Haiti Earthquakes, Zawacki flew to La Havana, Cuba, to make a site-specific stencil commenting on the recent devastation in the neighboring country of Haiti. His stencil work was titled 'Help Thy Neighbor' and depicted a young Cuban boy with tire raft, first aid medical kit, and a Haitian flag in hand ready to embark to what is assumed to be Haiti.

Blek le Rat one of the first graffiti artists in Paris, and has been described as the "Father of stencil graffiti". had personally selected Tavar Zawacki (still using his moniker, ABOVE) to make a duo exhibition together at White Walls Gallery in San Francisco on 1 May 2010.

In a press release from White Walls gallery, "The meeting of these two artists is a passing of the torch from the original stencil artist to a younger generation of urban artists following in his legacy. Blek let Rat first pioneered stencils in the early 80s as a bold, attention-grabbing form of street art that was never before seen. ABOVE is the prominent stencil artist of the new generation, drawing on Blek's methods to project a social message into the urban environment.

Mainstream media / social and political works (2011–2012) 

Zawacki's mural incorporated a hanging effigy of a suited banker to the installation. When NBC News did a news report on Tavar's "Wall St." piece, he told the reporter, "You don't have to read it, you just get it immediately when you see it. It's extremely aggressive and that's actually the point." His final reply was, "Everybody's entitled to their own opinion, and some people will praise it, others will deny it and criticize it, but the point being is that it's getting people talking about the movement."

In February 2012, Zawacki traveled to Johannesburg, South Africa, where he painted a mural commenting on the illegal blood diamond trade. He appropriated the proverb 'Diamonds are a girl's best friend' and painted the message 'Diamonds are a woman's best friend and a man's worst enemy' on the exterior wall of Jewel City, one of the world's largest diamond exporters.

The story of how Zawacki was able to trick the owners of Jewel city to paint such a large controversial statement on the exterior of their building without any trouble was, in the artist's words, a 'jewel heist' of his own. He said, "I was able to get away with this diamond wall heist because I told the owners I would paint in big letters 'Diamonds are a woman's best friend' on the exterior of their building. The owners loved the idea and all quickly agreed." According to Zawacki, the owners never came outside to inspect, or question his actions. In an interview with a reporter from ABC News, he said, "I decided to take it upon myself to justify lying as I felt that making this controversial statement seen, and the topic of blood diamonds talked about more, would justify my actions. I have justified my lying as I feel it created a powerful social and political piece."

In September 2012 amidst the Eurozone financial crisis, Zawacki flew to Zaragoza, Spain. This social, political, and time-sensitive mural addressed the hard financial times that Spain was facing with its highest unemployment rate in the world. At the time that Zawacki painted this mural 24.6% of Spaniards were unemployed; for under-25-year-olds, 53% were unemployed.

In the same month of September, Zawacki went to Copenhagen, Denmark, to create a time-lapse film titled #Socialmedia. He painted a message on the wall, then repainted the wall white, only to repaint a new message. He repeated this process of painting new statements over a duration of two days. Zawacki's messages were sarcastic mocks, factual, and confrontational towards society and the uses of social media. He profiled such social media platforms such as Facebook, :Twitter, and Instagram. In an interview, Zawacki said that he does not use social media such as Facebook, or Twitter, which allowed him to act as an outsider, looking in on how society uses such social media platforms.

Timing Is Everything (2013) 
In August 2013, Zawacki created a time-relative stencil titled 'Timing Is Everything' in London, England. The colorful stencil painted on the side of a wall depicted a break dancer positioned upside down, with his arm extended downwards. At night, the context of the stencil is 'activated' by the street light, thus creating a shadow of the nearby street pole directly onto the wall. The stenciled breakdancer is now seen in a newer context of balancing himself on top of the street sign's shadow. In an interview, Zawacki said, "all of my stencil works exist in a site-specific context. I have been searching for this fixed shadow in a high visibility location for the past eight months during my global travels. I finally found the perfect shadow in Shoreditch area of London."

According to Tavar, the main reason why 'the perfect shadow' was so challenging to find was because it needed to exist in a highly trafficked area of a major city. A reporter from the news blog The Huffington Post claimed, "If Banksy and James Turrell were ever to collaborate, we like to think Tavar Zawacki would be their brainchild."

The majority of Zawacki's street works have topics of social or political issues suggested in the artworks. During an interview, he commented, "The Timing Is Everything stencil painted in London was void of any political or social message, but what it did have was an interaction with the city, and how things alter from day to night. The stencil shows how timing and lighting can be the platform, as well as the inspiration for a piece of work." He closed the interview by saying, "My main intention with this piece is to have people observe, and re-evaluate their surroundings of how literally, timing is everything."

Abstract Arrow Period (2014–2016) 

In June 2014 Zawacki was one of the international artists invited to paint at Artscape mural event held in the city of Malmö, Sweden. He painted a mural titled Metamorphosis on an eight-story building in a style replicating the color printing process of CMYK. He explained, "I've been interested in shapes and colors for many years now. The arrow is its own unique shape, and when I overlap this colorful shape using the CMYK color blend process, it allows for new shapes and colors to metamorphosis into something new." He continued, "It's about having fun and experimenting. As an artist it's important for me to experiment with my work, otherwise one can become stagnant. Making this mural put the arrow into a new context, giving it room for expansion of a new life."

In September 2014 Zawacki had a three-month-long artist-in-residence run in Detroit, Michigan in preparation for his solo exhibition titled 'Remix'. His Remix exhibition displayed a variety of different laser cut wood panels that were then 'remixed', and exchanged into the artwork's final configuration. "The intention for the Remix body of work is to find a balanced symbiosis between curved and straight lines. The characteristics of the arrow are straight, sharp, angular, and void of any curved elements. My intention is to mix a variety of curved shapes within the straight-arrow design, creating a totally new visual appearance." When asked the question, 'What strides do you think you have made with this work?,' Zawacki replied, "The variety of new curved elements from the Remix exhibition allowed me to expand the arrow design into something new and exciting. The emphasis was less on the arrow, and more on the mix of curved, and straight-lined shapes. The arrow icon was breaking apart and morphing into new (and exciting) abstract shapes."

In October 2015 Zawacki painted the largest mural of his career at that time, a 33-meter tall (108 feet) by 17-meter wide (55 feet) mural titled 'Incognito' in Johannesburg, South Africa as part of the City of Gold Festival. He spent ten consecutive days painting the mural and when asked in an interview about his process, challenges, and color choices he stated 'My color selections were predetermined by the relationship of how each color transforms when laid on top of another. This was easy, however, in the designing of the mural I had to constantly move colors and shapes to finally get the final color arrangement you see. The biggest challenge for me during the Incognito mural was ensuring the proportions of the design were correct. I needed precision and a lot of it.  The lines needed to be sharp and straight. If any line was miscalculated or skewed the design as a whole would suffer. This was my largest hurdle I had to overcome both with mapping it out and painting it. Later in the interview, Zawacki said, 'What I enjoy most about the Incognito design is the secondary shapes, and colors achieved from the overlapping of each arrow on top of another. There are many fun intersections of color and new shapes that emerge using this style of design. I look forward to exploring more in-depth into this style in the future in my indoor and outdoor works.'

In March 2016 Zawacki, still using his moniker, 'ABOVE', had a solo exhibition in Zürich, Switzerland titled '12 Months'.
In a section of Zawacki's artist statement, he wrote, 'My intention with my recent body of work is to show the viewer a visual portrayal of associations, and experiences I’ve had with each Month. This body of work explores new ways of incorporating my arrow icon into a variety of patterns, configurations, and abstract styles while using the entire color spectrum as my palette. My process started with reflecting back on each year, making detailed lists of colors, feelings, and associations I have with each month. I would use my written notes and transform these words into the visual designs of shape and color, you see in each painting. I aimed to create each work with a unique feeling, while still having consistency within the body of work. I intended to have my arrow icon act as a supporting role in every month's composition. My goal is to have the arrow interact, transform, and re-create its shape as much as possible, helping illustrate the emotion and feeling of each month. During my creative process, the consistent changing of colors, and emotions of each month both inspired, and challenged me.'

In the summer of 2016, Zawacki served as artist-in-residence of the Quin Arts program at the Quin Hotel in New York City, furthering his exploration of geometric abstraction through colorful multi-layer arrow compositions. As curated by DK Johnston, the exhibit featured 36 works of handmade sculptural relief using acrylic and resin on wood. It opened on 14 July and was Zawacki's first solo show in New York City.

Metamorphosis (2017) 
In January 2017, Zawacki decided to step out of his self-imposed shadow of anonymity, and start creating, and signing his artworks with his real birth name – allowing more freedom of creative exploration, as well as freedom from the arrow icon he had formerly associated himself with. He stated, 'My decision suddenly liberated me, as well as opened up creative ideas to a seemingly unlimited expansion of new opportunities. I see a new foundation to expand upon, free of any artistic restrictions, and my curiosity to push my creative limits to new, higher levels'.

Zawacki debuted his museum-style solo exhibition titled, Metamorphosis in September 2017, at Urban Spree Galerie in Berlin.
Metamorphosis' entire body of work was painted on large format canvases, and profiled four different painting styles, Op-Art, Trompe-l'œil, CMYK and Hard-edge painting. He described his exhibition: 'Metamorphosis is about transformation from one state into a newer dynamic one. With a lot of brutal honesty, and conviction for growth I was able to take inner inventory of what no longer served me. I was able to let go of the fears that were stifling my creative progression. I was prepared for feeling uncomfortable during this metamorphosis. I was learning how to unblock my personal censors, and be valiant in painting the styles of works I’ve previously been too reluctant to paint.' Zawacki's Metamorphosis exhibition was the first time in his career that he made, and signed all his works with his real name.

In September Zawacki's second book, also titled Metamorphosis, was published. Metamorphosis is a 168-page hardcover book covering his last 3 years of creative works, from his seminal 2014 Remix exhibition in Detroit to his latest and most ambitious show to date at Urban Spree Galerie in September 2017. The book covers all his outdoor murals during that period and illustrates how the artist navigates between his indoor and outdoor works and the influences thereof.

Shapeshifting (2018) 
In November 2018, Zawacki presented his solo exhibition, Shapeshifting at Wunderkammern gallery in Milan, Italy. For this occasion the artist has decided to reflect on the concept of metamorphosis intended in a personal and artistic sense, testing himself with the use of different types of shapes and colors.

Artist Shepard Fairey wrote the introduction text for the Shapeshifting exhibition: "I have known Tavar Zawacki's art for more than 15 years. I initially knew him by his street name, 'ABOVE'. Tavar impressed me with his dedication to mastering the most essential aspects of street art: widespread coverage, recognizable iconography, and impressive placements on the street in terms of risk and visual impact. It seems to me that two years ago Tavar Zawacki had pushed his anonymous ABOVE concept to the pinnacle of what is possible and respected in the street art world, and decided it was time to expand his parameters and evolve, stepping into the sunlight by using his birth name and evolving away from just his long-present arrow icon. However, Tavar did not abandon the fruits of his years of graphic mastery in form and color, he simply chose to apply them in broader, more ambitious, and more sophisticated ways.

The recent works in the street and the studio leading up to his Shapeshifting exhibition are the most visually dynamic but seductive pieces of Tavar's career. Sometimes the fundamental ingredients are there, but it takes the subtle moves to yield sublime alchemy. Tavar's newest works embody power and beauty in elegant harmony, but especially the pieces that utilize trompe-l'œil push beyond design-based art to create a provocatively surreal 2D/3D dialogue that distinguishes them. Tavar's 2D/3D dialogue extends to three-dimensional pieces using gradients to mimic light play on reflective surfaces and cast shadows. Tavar has evolved and in the process developed a truly distinctive, powerful but luxurious, visual language."

Metamorphosis #5 (2019) 

In September 2019, Tavar was commissioned by one of the oldest public arts institutions in the United States, The Albright–Knox Art Gallery Museum in Buffalo, New York for their largest and most ambitious public art project, as well as Tavar's largest mural of his career. Tavar's Metamorphosis #5 mural received a lot of media attention from the city of Buffalo, as his mural is the largest public art mural not only in Buffalo but all of Western New York. When interviewed by local TV channel NBC WGRZ Channel 2 about his mural he stated 'If you look at it closely you can see an upward pointing arrow symbol that represents a 'rise above' mentality. For me now, I'm actually more interested in the abstract shapes that compose the design. Tavar continues to say, 'I think what's great is the mural it's open to interpretation, that's why I love abstract art, each person can see it for what they want. Some people might not even see the arrows, which I think is great.' Aaron Ott, Curator of Public Art for the Albright Knox Museum said this about Zawacki's mural. 
'Recently he's begun to expand his practice. The Metamorphosis #5 mural is an expansion of his studio practice, something that he wants to share with people, that is hopeful, but also talks about the kind of energy that you get from the streets but that you can share throughout the world in museum settings, galleries, and here, with public art." Tavar later said in the interview, 'I subscribe to the mindset that if you have an idea and enough persistence you can make anything happen. He added 'To just keep following your passion and just always believe in yourself, regardless of what anybody or the outside world says about it. If your passion is there you will succeed.

Lockdown paintings (2020-2021) 

In February, 2020 Tavar decided to leave his home in Berlin, Germany, and move to Bali, Indonesia. After one month upon his arrival to Bali the Covid-19 global pandemic had spread, shutting down international travel as well as lockdown restrictions. In March, 2020 at the start of the lockdowns on the island of Bali, Tavar started to paint a new collection of paintings appropriately titled, Lockdown. He is quoted as, 'During the global pandemic of 2020, I spent an average of 9–10 hours a day paintings alone in my Bali studio. The Lockdown collection helped me cope (in a healthy & positive way) with the challenging uncertainties that were unfolding around me each day. Every painting in this collection is a personal reflection of what I was feeling during the time span from March 2020 until April 2021.' Tavar continued to add 'the Lockdown collection of paintings are the most personal and authentic paintings I’ve ever painted thus far in my career. The Lockdown collection was the jump-off point for me into the direction and style of painting I’ve been aiming for in my career.

Exhibitions

Selected solo exhibitions 

 2021: LOCKDOWN, Virtual Reality Gallery - Bali, Indonesia 
 2019: INCOGNITO STUDIES, Die Kunstagentin Gallery - Cologne, Germany 
 2018: SHAPESHIFTING, Wunderkammern Gallery - Milan, Italy 
 2017: METAMORPHOSIS, Urban Spree Gallery - Berlin, Germany 
 2016: UNTITLED, The Quin - New York City, U.S.A.
 2016: 12 MONTHS, Soon Gallery - Zürich, Switzerland
 2014: REMIX, Inner State Gallery - Detroit, U.S.A.
 2013: PUSH & PULL, Chez Joe - Paris, France
 2012: JETSET, Metro Gallery - Melbourne, Australia
 2011: RISE ABOVE, Art Basel Miami - Miami, U.S.A
 2011: HERE TODAY, GONE TOMORROW - Lofi Gallery - Sydney, Australia
 2010: TRANSITIONS, White Walls Gallery - San Francisco, U.S.A.

Personal life 
Tavar lives and works in Lisbon, Portugal. Tavar is an avid surfer and skateboarder. He was born and raised in northern California and has been skateboarding since he was 13 years old. He speaks five languages and is a vegetarian.

Bibliography 
 Tavar Zawacki,  Metamorphosis

168 pages, full color, hardcover. Printed in Czech Republic. Published by: Urban Spree Books, 2017.

Metamorphosis, the second published monograph by the Berlin-based, American abstract artist Tavar Zawacki – and the first under his real name.

Metamorphosis covers Tavar Zawacki's last 3 years of creative works, profiling his large scale outdoor murals, and his indoor gallery works. Zawacki's museum-style exhibition, also titled Metamorphosis, is widely featured in the first half of the book.

 Above, Above: Passport

Passport: 156-page book documenting the artworks and travels of Tavar Zawacki in over 60 countries from 2004 to 2010. California: Zero+ Publishing, 2011.

Artist Shepard Fairey wrote the introduction in Passport, saying "I first encountered Above's art on the streets of Paris in early 2003. His large scale trademark arrows were painted on a roll down gates, trucks, and storefronts with impressive coverage throughout the city. Above is extraordinarily driven. To paraphrase Radiohead, "ambition can make you look pretty ugly," but in Above's case, his ambition makes the streets look very engaging. I am very impressed by Above's diligence, but after I got to know him and his artwork more, I began to realize that his output is not evidence of selfish ego, but of a lust for life, a utopian life, where his generosity, and curiosity, and his pursuit of creativity and social-consciousness have led him around the world making more friends than enemies.

Above made the time to act as a tour guide for me and my wife and our two young daughters in a city he knows well and we didn't. The gesture made me greatly value Above's friendship and reinforced my belief that what you give is what you get. The Karma Police are not coming for Above even if the police vandal squad is."

Books featuring interview/works from Tavar Zawacki 
In English:
 Søren Solkær, "Surface", Gingko Press, 2015, 
 Nicholas Ganz, "Street Messages", Dokument Press, 2015, 
 Anna Waclawek,  Graffiti And Street Art, Thames and Hudson, 2011, 
 Christian Hundertmark, The Art of Rebellion 1, Publikat Verlag, 2003, 
 Christian Hundertmark, The Art of Rebellion 2, Publikat Verlag, 2006, 
 Christian Hundertmark, The Art of Rebellion 3, Publikat Verlag, 2010, 
 Without Reason, Ilovewr, Without Reason, 2006, 
 Markus Mai, Writing: Urban Calligraphy And Beyond, Die Gestalten Verlag, 2003, 
 Gary Shove, Untitled, I, Carpet Bombing Publishing 2009 
 Gary Shove, Untitled, II, Carpet Bombing Publishing 2010 
 Gary Shove, Untitled, III, Carpet Bombing Publishing, 2011, 
 Maxime Courtin, Colors Zoo, Colorzoo publishing, 2004, 
 Nicholas Ganz, Graffiti World, Thames & Hudson, 2004 
 Tristan Manco, Street Logos, Thames & Hudson, 2004, 
 Louis Bou, Street Art: The Spray Files, HarperCollins, 2005 
 Louis Bou, NYC BCN: Street Art Revolution, Collins Design, 2006, 
 Izastickup, Bo130, Microbo, TheDon, Drago, 2005, 
 Claudia Walde, Sticker City, Thames & Hudson, 2007, 
 R. Klanten, M. Huebner, Urban Interventions, Die Gestalten, 2010 

In French:
 Kriss Montfort, Hip art the french touch, éditions Kitchen 93, 2004, (see p. 81) 
 Collectif, Une Nuit, éditions Kitchen 93, 2007, (see p. 72) 
 Fabienne Grevy, Paris Graffiti, Editions de la Martiniere, 2008, 

In Italian:
 Duccio Dogheria, Street Art (Storia e Controstoria Techniche e Protagonisti), Giunti, 2015,

References

External links 

 

Living people
1981 births
American graffiti artists
American abstract artists
American contemporary painters
American printmakers
Public art
Trompe-l'œil artists
21st-century American painters
Painters from California
American muralists
Political artists
American male painters
Artists from San Francisco